Ian Powell (born 14 October 1940) is  a former Australian rules footballer who played with Fitzroy in the Victorian Football League (VFL).

Notes

External links 
		

Living people
1940 births
Australian rules footballers from Victoria (Australia)
Fitzroy Football Club players
Heidelberg Football Club players